John Vincent Regan (12 September 1912 – 11 August 1988) was an Australian rules footballer who represented Collingwood in the Victorian Football League (VFL) during the 1930s and 1940s.

Playing career 
Recruited from Northcote, Regan struggled in his first few seasons and was tried in a variety of positions before he established himself at full-back.

Taking on and matching full-forwards like South Melbourne's Bob Pratt (whom Regan regarded as his most difficult opponent), Carlton's Harry Vallence, Richmond's Jack Titus and St Kilda's Bill Mohr, Regan earned his title as the "Prince of Full-backs". He was a magnificent mark and a superb kick. Archival footage shows him using the now defunct drop kick for his kick-ins. In slow motion they demonstrate his perfect balance and timing.

Regan was among the best players in the Magpies' 1935 and 1936 premiership victories, both against South Melbourne.

In May 1938, during a match against Carlton, Regan fell heavily and suffered a double dislocation of an elbow. He spent a week at St Vincent's Hospital, and ended up missing nine matches. He recovered in time to play a part in Collingwood's finals campaign, but again for the second successive year was on the losing end as Carlton emerged victorious with the 1938 pennant.

In January 1942 Regan announced his retirement from football to join the Salesian community at Sunbury as a lay brother.

In February 1943, with Australia now involved heavily in the Second World War, Regan enlisted with the Royal Australian Air Force (RAAF) and served as a leading aircraftman. He returned in 1943 to captain Collingwood.

In April 1946, shortly after being discharged from military service, Regan returned to Collingwood and trained so well that he was selected for their Round 1 match of the 1946 season against Hawthorn.

In March 1947, it was announced that Regan had been appointed coach of Kalgoorlie City Football Club in Goldfields Football League.

Essendon champion Dick Reynolds considered Regan the best full-back he ever saw. In an article for Melbourne newspaper The Argus Reynolds recounted watching Regan play state football against the likes of Ken Farmer from South Australia and George Doig from Western Australia and said: [H]e made them earn every goal they kicked against him. It was great to see the way in which he shadowed them or marked or punched the ball away, and then, with great dash and a beautiful kick, sent the ball in the right position for an attack. His quick thinking and unruffled style at critical moments made him a star full-back.

During his playing career, Regan had worked as a clerk for the Commonwealth Social Service in Melbourne. After returning to Melbourne from Kalgoorlie he continued to serve at Collingwood for many years, and was club secretary from 1969 to 1977.

Posthumous honours 
Regan was among the first players inducted into the Australian Football Hall of Fame in 1996, but was overlooked for the full-back position when the Team of the Century was named. That honour went instead to Carlton's Stephen Silvagni, to the bewilderment of many in the Australian football community. In 1997, when the Collingwood Team of the Century was announced, Regan was named at full-back.

In 2004, at the launch of the Collingwood Hall of Fame, Regan was one of 18 inducted players.

The Collingwood player who finishes fifth in the club's best-and-fairest count is awarded the Jack Regan Trophy.

Notes

References 
 Renn, Ronald Percy, "Renn looks on Saturday's games", The Age, (Monday, 26 April 1937), p.6.

External links

 Collingwood Team of the Century
 
 Profile at Australian Football
 Jack Regan's Service Record at the RAAF

1988 deaths
1912 births
Collingwood Football Club players
Collingwood Football Club Premiership players
Copeland Trophy winners
Australian Football Hall of Fame inductees
Northcote Football Club players
Kalgoorlie City Football Club players
Australian rules footballers from Melbourne
Royal Australian Air Force personnel of World War II
Royal Australian Air Force airmen
Two-time VFL/AFL Premiership players
People from Northcote, Victoria
Military personnel from Melbourne